Edwin Booth Willis (January 28, 1893 – November 26, 1963) was an American motion picture set designer and decorator.

Willis worked exclusively at Metro-Goldwyn-Mayer studios for his entire career. During his career as a set designer Willis worked on over 600 separate productions.  The Internet Movie Database lists his 577 film credits as set decorator, 163 credits as interior decorator and 24 credits as art director.

He was nominated for the Academy Award in his profession 32 times, in certain years receiving multiple nominations. Willis won the Oscar on eight occasions. He was born in Decatur, Illinois and died of cancer in Hollywood, in 1963.

Major awards

Academy Awards
Interior decoration (Color)
Blossoms in the Dust - 1941
The Yearling - 1946

Interior decoration (Black & white)
Gaslight - 1944

Art direction/Set decoration (Color)
Little Women - 1949
An American in Paris - 1951

Art direction/Set decoration (Black & white)
The Bad and the Beautiful - 1952
Julius Caesar - 1953
Somebody Up There Likes Me - 1956

Academy Award nominations
Interior decoration
The Great Ziegfeld - 1936
Romeo and Juliet - 1936

Interior decoration (Black & white)
When Ladies Meet - 1941
Random Harvest - 1942
Madame Curie - 1943
The Picture of Dorian Gray - 1945

Interior decoration (Color)
Thousands Cheer - 1943
Kismet - 1944
National Velvet - 1945

Art direction/Set decoration (Black & white)
Madame Bovary - 1949
The Red Danube - 1950
Too Young to Kiss - 1951
Executive Suite - 1954
I'll Cry Tomorrow - 1955
Blackboard Jungle - 1955

Art direction/Set decoration (Color)
Annie Get Your Gun - 1950
The Merry Widow - 1952
Lili - 1953
Young Bess -1953
The Story of Three Loves - 1953
Brigadoon - 1954
Lust For Life - 1956

Art Direction/Set Decoration
Les Girls - 1957
Raintree County - 1957

External links

1893 births
1963 deaths
Best Art Direction Academy Award winners
American scenic designers
People from Decatur, Illinois
Deaths from cancer in California